Various newspapers have been known as The Centreville Times.

Centreville, Maryland has had two newspapers called the Centreville Times. The first was a weekly publication whose full title was the Centreville Times & Eastern Shore Advertiser (later the Centreville Times and Eastern Shore Publick Advertiser), which was published from 1822 onwards. The second was a weekly publication that was later to become the Centreville Observer, which was published until 1864.

The 1822 Centreville Times was the first newspaper to be published in Queen Anne's County.

References 

Publications established in 1822
1822 establishments in Maryland